This is a list of public holidays in Djibouti. The country uses two official calendar systems: the Gregorian calendar primarily, and the Islamic lunar calendar for religious holidays.

See also
Public holidays in Somalia

References

Djibouti
Djiboutian culture
Society of Djibouti
Djibouti